The following events occurred in June 1989:

June 1, 1989 (Thursday)
Pope John Paul II begins a 10-day trip to Norway, Iceland, Finland, Denmark and Sweden. He arrives in Norway on June 1 and leaves on June 3, visiting Oslo, Trondheim and Tromsø.
Cold War: A farmer discovers the burned remains of German security hacker Karl Koch in a forest near Celle, Lower Saxony, West Germany. Despite the unusual circumstances, Koch, who had sold computer data from military and aerospace companies to the KGB, is determined to have committed suicide by self-immolation on May 23.
During the night of June 1–2, American serial killer Oba Chandler rapes 36-year-old Joan Rogers and her 17- and 14-year-old daughters Michelle and Christe and then murders them by throwing them, alive, into Tampa Bay, Florida, weighted with concrete blocks.
Born:
Hadiza Aliyu, Nigerian actress and filmmaker; in Libreville, Gabon
Nataliya Goncharova, Russian Olympic volleyball player; in Skole, Lviv Oblast, Ukrainian Soviet Socialist Republic, Soviet Union
Sammy Alex Mutahi, Kenyan long-distance runner
Died:
Irena Dubiska, 89, Polish violinist
Aurelio Lampredi, 71, Italian automobile and aircraft engine designer
Martin Zoborosky (a.k.a. Martin Edwards), 72, Canadian professional ice hockey defenceman; played one game in the National Hockey League

June 2, 1989 (Friday)
Sōsuke Uno succeeds Noboru Takeshita as Prime Minister of Japan.
18-year-old Tina Bell disappears in Billingham, England. Her remains will be found in April 1990 on wasteland at ICI Billingham. , Bell's murder will remain unsolved.
The Uniroyal Chemical Co. announces a voluntary halt to sales in the United States of the chemical Alar, used to improve the shelf life and color of apples. Studies had linked Alar with tumor development in lab animals.
Born:
Freddy Adu, American soccer player; in Tema, Ghana
Liviu Antal, Romanian footballer; in Șimleu Silvaniei, Romania
Davide Appollonio, Italian professional road bicycle racer; in Isernia, Molise, Italy
Dean Burmester, South African professional golfer; in Mutare, Zimbabwe
Austin Davis, National Football League quarterback and coach; in Meridian, Mississippi
Cooper Helfet, National Football League tight end; in Kentfield, California
Alex Love, American flyweight boxer; in Monroe, Washington
Willy Moon (born William George Sinclair), New Zealand musician, singer and songwriter; in Wellington, New Zealand
Kilakone Siphonexay, Laotian Olympic sprinter; in Vientiane, Laos
Steve Smith, Australian cricketer; in Sydney, New South Wales, Australia
Darius van Driel, Dutch professional golfer; in Leidschendam, Netherlands
Shane Yarran, Australian rules footballer; in Seville Grove, Western Australia (d. 2018, suicide)
Nanda Zulmi, Indonesian footballer (d. 2017)
Died:
Ted à Beckett, 81, Australian cricketer, Australian rules footballer and solicitor
Guido Agosti, 87, Italian pianist and piano teacher
Dick Mayer (born Alvin Richard Mayer), 64, American professional golfer
Takeo Watanabe, 56, Japanese musician and composer, cancer

June 3, 1989 (Saturday)
The world's first high-definition television (test) broadcasts commence in Japan, in analogue.
Dissolution of the Soviet Union: The Fergana massacre begins in the Fergana Valley, Uzbek Soviet Socialist Republic, Soviet Union. By the time the massacre ends on June 12, at least 97 Meskhetian Turks will have been killed and over 1000 wounded by Uzbek extremists.
Pope John Paul II arrives in Iceland, visiting Reykjavík and Þingvellir before leaving on June 4.
The SkyDome, the world's first retractable roof stadium, opens in Downtown Toronto, Ontario, Canada.
Born:
Nicole Della Monica, Italian Olympic pair skater; in Trescore Balneario, Province of Bergamo, Italy
Megumi Han, Japanese actress; in Tokyo, Japan
Katie Hoff, American Olympic swimmer; in Abingdon, Maryland
Artem Kravets, Ukrainian footballer; in Dniprodzerzhynsk, Ukrainian SSR, Soviet Union
Imogen Poots, British actress; in London, England
Viengsavanh Sayyaboun, Laotian footballer; in Vientiane, Laos
Anthony Taugourdeau, French footballer; in Marseille, France
Daniela Vega, Chilean actress and opera singer; in San Miguel, Santiago Province, Chile
Died:
Jack Belden (born Alfred Goodwin Belden), 79, American war correspondent, lung cancer
Ruhollah Khomeini, 86 or 89, Iranian philosopher, politician, revolutionary and Shia Muslim religious leader, 1st Supreme Leader of Iran, surgical complications and heart failure

June 4, 1989 (Sunday)
A giant wave strikes the trimaran Rose-Noëlle, carrying four men from New Zealand on an adventure trip to Tonga, flipping it upside-down. The men will drift at sea for 119 days before winds and currents carry the wrecked yacht in a loop to Great Barrier Island.
1989 Tiananmen Square protests and massacre: A violent military crackdown takes place on pro-democracy protesters in Tiananmen Square, Beijing.

Death and state funeral of Ruhollah Khomeini: Tehran radio announces Khomeini's death at 7:00 a.m. At 9:00 a.m., Ali Khamenei, the President of Iran, begins reading Khomeini's last will and testament to the Assembly of Experts. In the afternoon the Assembly elects Khamenei as Supreme Leader (rahbar).
Ufa train disaster: A natural gas explosion near Ufa, Russian Soviet Federative Socialist Republic, Soviet Union, kills 575 as two trains passing each other throw sparks near a leaky pipeline. The disaster receives relatively little media attention, possibly due to Soviet censorship and the other major news events of the day.
Revolutions of 1989: Solidarity's victory in the first round of the 1989 Polish legislative election is the first of many anti-communist revolutions in Central and Eastern Europe.
Pope John Paul II arrives in Finland, visiting Helsinki and Turku before leaving on June 6.
The bodies of Joan, Michelle and Christe Rogers are found floating in Tampa Bay.
American driver Dale Earnhardt wins the 1989 Budweiser 500 stock car race at Dover Downs International Speedway in Dover, Delaware.
The V International AIDS Conference begins in Montreal, Quebec, Canada. It will continue through June 9.
At the 43rd Tony Awards, The Heidi Chronicles wins the award for Best Play, while Jerome Robbins' Broadway wins the award for Best Musical.
Born:
Federico Erba, Italian footballer; in Rome, Italy
Paweł Fajdek, Polish Olympic hammer thrower; in Świebodzice, Poland
Eldar Gasimov, Azerbaijani singer (Ell & Nikki); in Baku, Azerbaijan Soviet Socialist Republic, Soviet Union
Bernard Le Roux, South African-born French rugby union player; in Moorreesburg, Western Cape, South Africa
Died:
Dik Browne, 71, American cartoonist, cancer
Vernon Cracknell, 77, New Zealand politician

June 5, 1989 (Monday)
1989 Tiananmen Square protests and massacre: An unknown Chinese protester, "Tank Man", stands in front of a column of military tanks on Chang'an Avenue in Beijing, temporarily halting them, an incident which achieves iconic status internationally through images taken by Western photographers.
Death and state funeral of Ruhollah Khomeini: Eight people are killed and hundreds injured in a human crush during the viewing of Khomeini's body at the Musalla in Tehran.
Born:
Cam Atkinson, American National Hockey League right winger; in Riverside, Connecticut
Mónica Castaño, Colombian beauty queen and model
Roxana Cocoș, Romanian Olympic weightlifter; in Bucharest, Romania
Ed Davis, National Basketball Association player; in Washington, D.C.
Megumi Nakajima, Japanese voice actress and singer; in Mito, Ibaraki, Japan
Died: Maurice Philippe, 57, British aircraft and Formula One car designer

June 6, 1989 (Tuesday)
Japanese serial killer Tsutomu Miyazaki murders 5-year-old Ayako Nomoto. Over the next two days he will engage in sexual acts with the girl's corpse and take photos and videos of it.
Death and state funeral of Ruhollah Khomeini: The Ayatollah Khomeini's first funeral in Tehran is aborted by officials after a large crowd storms the funeral procession, nearly destroying Khomeini's wooden casket in order to get a last glimpse of his body. At one point, the body almost falls to the ground, as the crowd attempt to grab pieces of the death shroud. The Ayatollah's body has to be returned for the burial preparations to be repeated, before being brought back to the cemetery a few hours later.
Pope John Paul II arrives in Denmark, visiting Åsebakken Priory, Roskilde, Copenhagen and Øm before leaving on June 7.
Democratic Representative Tom Foley of Washington is elected Speaker of the United States House of Representatives, defeating Republican Representative Robert H. Michel by a vote of 251-164. The Speaker's chair had been vacated by the resignation of Jim Wright due to a scandal.
In professional basketball, the 1989 NBA Finals begin between the Detroit Pistons and the Los Angeles Lakers.
Born:
Bryn McAuley, Canadian actress; in Toronto, Ontario, Canada
Robert Sacre, American-Canadian National Basketball Association player; in Baton Rouge, Louisiana

June 7, 1989 (Wednesday)
The British government announces that it will sell the Short Brothers aerospace company, the largest employer in Northern Ireland, to the Canadian company Bombardier Inc.

Surinam Airways Flight 764, originating from Amsterdam Airport Schiphol, crashes in Paramaribo, Suriname, due to pilot error, killing 176. Among the dead are 14 members of an exhibition football team known as the "Colourful XI" (Kleurijk Elftal) (one of whom dies in hospital three days later) and their coach; three players survive.
Died in the crash of Surinam Airways Flight 764:
Ruud Degenaar, 25, Heracles Almelo
Lloyd Doesburg, 29, AFC Ajax
Steve van Dorpel, 23, FC Volendam
Wendel Fräser, 22, RBC Roosendaal
Frits Goodings, 25, FC Wageningen
Jerry Haatrecht, 28, Neerlandia
Virgall Joemankhan, 20, Cercle Brugge K.S.V.
Andro Knel, 21, NAC Breda
Ruben Kogeldans, 22, Willem II Tilburg
Fred Patrick, 23, PEC Zwolle
Andy Scharmin, 21, FC Twente
Elfried Veldman, 23, De Graafschap
Florian Vijent, 27, SC Telstar
Nick Stienstra, 34, RCH (coach)
The United States Navy submarine USS Blenny, launched in 1944, is sunk as part of an artificial reef off Ocean City, Maryland. Former crewmembers of the Blenny are present for the sinking ceremony.
Born:
James Hamilton, New Zealand Olympic snowboarder; in Takapuna, New Zealand
Seiji Kobayashi, Japanese professional baseball catcher
Agyemang Opoku (born Nana Opoku Agyemang-Prempeh), Ghanaian footballer; in Obuasi, Ashanti Region, Ghana
Mitch Robinson, Australian rules footballer
Sofía Sisniega, Mexican actress; in Cuernavaca, Morelos, Mexico
Died:
Chico Landi (born Francisco Sacco Landi), 81, Brazilian Formula One driver
Nara Leão, 47, Brazilian bossa nova singer, brain tumor

June 8, 1989 (Thursday)
Pope John Paul II arrives in Sweden, visiting Stockholm, Uppsala and Vadstena Castle before leaving for Rome on June 10.
Trump Shuttle begins service between Washington, D.C., New York City and Boston. Businessman Donald Trump had acquired the operations of Eastern Air Lines Shuttle the previous day. USAir will acquire the shuttle service in 1992 and rename it USAir Shuttle.
U.S. President George H. W. Bush holds the first prime time news conference of his presidency. When asked whether he has contacted any of China's leaders by telephone about the recent events there, Bush replies, "Line was busy. Couldn't get through."
Born:
Timea Bacsinszky, Swiss tennis player; in Lausanne, Switzerland
Richard Fleeshman, English actor and singer-songwriter; in Manchester, England
Simon Trummer, Swiss racing driver; in Frutigen, Canton of Bern, Switzerland
Minami Tsuda, Japanese voice actress; in Kanagawa Prefecture, Japan
Amaury Vassili, French operatic tenor; in Rouen, Upper Normandy, France
Died:
Susan Daniels Smith, 27–28, American FBI informant, murdered by her handler and lover, Agent Mark Putnam
Albert Spaggiari, 56, French criminal, lung cancer

June 9, 1989 (Friday)
Born:
Chloë Agnew, Irish singer; in Knocklyon, County Dublin, Ireland
Danilo Avelar, Brazilian footballer; in Paranavaí, Brazil
Logan Browning, American actress; in Atlanta, Georgia
Baden Kerr, New Zealand rugby union player; in Papakura, Auckland, New Zealand
Josie Tomic, Australian Olympic track cyclist; in Subiaco, Western Australia
Dídac Vilà, Spanish footballer; in Mataró, Spain
Died:
George Beadle, 85, American geneticist, recipient of the Nobel Prize in Physiology or Medicine, Alzheimer's disease
Rashid Behbudov, 73, Azerbaijani singer and actor, kidney disease
Vladimir Kasatonov, 78, Soviet admiral of the fleet, Hero of the Soviet Union
José López Rega OIC, 72, Argentine politician, diabetes/heart attack
Wolfdietrich Schnurre, 68, German writer, heart failure

June 10, 1989 (Saturday)

A groundbreaking ceremony is held for a new, modern facility for Woodbridge Hospital (later known as the Institute of Mental Health) in Singapore.
United States Air Force Captain Jacquelyn S. Parker graduates from the U.S. Air Force Test Pilot School at Edwards Air Force Base, the first female pilot to do so.
Born:
DeAndre Kane, American-born Hungarian professional basketball player; in Pittsburgh, Pennsylvania
David Miller, South African cricketer; in Pietermaritzburg, Natal, South Africa
Alexandra Stan, Romanian singer-songwriter; in Constanța, Romania
William Whetton, New Zealand rugby union player
Died:
Ortwin Linger, 21, Dutch footballer (HFC Haarlem), dies three days after the crash of Surinam Airways Flight 764 as a result of his injuries.
Richard Quine, 68, American actor and director, suicide by gunshot

June 11, 1989 (Sunday)
American racer Kevin Schwantz of the Suzuki Pepsi Cola team wins the 1989 Yugoslavian motorcycle Grand Prix at the Automotodrom Grobnik circuit near Rijeka, Yugoslavia.
27-year-old New Zealand mountaineer David Heymann falls  to his death from the Hörnli Ridge on the Matterhorn. His climbing partner, Greg Houston, descends the mountain alone without the pair's ropes, which Heymann had been carrying.
American driver Ricky Rudd wins the 1989 Banquet Frozen Foods 300 stock car race at Sears Point International Raceway in Sonoma, California.
A Beechcraft sightseeing plane carrying 10 tourists and the pilot disappears between the islands of Hawaii and Maui.
Born:
Lorenzo Ariaudo, Italian footballer; in Turin, Italy
Keith Aulie, Canadian National Hockey League defenceman; in Rouleau, Saskatchewan, Canada
Conrad Baden, Norwegian composer and organist (b. 1908)
Ana Clara Duarte, Brazilian tennis player; in Rio de Janeiro, Brazil
Maya Moore, American professional and Olympic champion basketball player; in Jefferson City, Missouri

June 12, 1989 (Monday)
A powerful time bomb kills at least seven people and injures or maims 54 others at the main railroad station in New Delhi, India.
The Corcoran Gallery of Art in Washington, D.C. cancels Robert Mapplethorpe's photography exhibition, "Robert Mapplethorpe: The Perfect Moment", due to its sexually explicit content. Mapplethorpe had died of AIDS in March 1989.
Glen Sather steps down as head coach of the National Hockey League's Edmonton Oilers and is succeeded by John Muckler.
Dubin inquiry: Canadian Olympic sprinter Ben Johnson admits under oath that he used steroids beginning in 1981, leading to his disqualification at the 1988 Summer Olympics.
At Caesars Palace in Paradise, Nevada, American boxers Sugar Ray Leonard and Thomas Hearns fight in a rematch of their September 1981 bout. The fight ends in a draw after 12 rounds. On the undercard, Andrew Maynard defeats Steve Schwan, Ray Mercer knocks out Ken Crosby, Kennedy McKinney wins by decision over David Moreno, Michael Carbajal defeats Eduardo Nunez, and Robert Wangila wins by decision over Buck Smith.
Born:
Emma Eliasson, Swedish professional and Olympic ice hockey defender; in Karesuando, Kiruna, Sweden
Andrea Guardini, Italian cyclist; in Tregnago, Italy
Ibrahim Jeilan, Ethiopian long-distance runner; in Bale Province, Ethiopia
Shane Lowry, Australian footballer; in Perth, Western Australia
Tim Nanai-Williams, New Zealand-born Samoan rugby union player; in Auckland, New Zealand
Dale Stephens, English footballer; in Bolton, England
Died:
Bruce Hamilton , 77, Australian public servant
Cath Vautier , 86, New Zealand netball player, teacher and sports administrator

June 13, 1989 (Tuesday)
Six miners drown at the Emu Mine near Leinster, Western Australia, in an accident caused by heavy rains.
End of socialism in Hungary: Formal beginning of the Hungarian Round Table Talks.
During a four-day visit by Mikhail Gorbachev, the General Secretary of the Communist Party of the Soviet Union, to West Germany, Gorbachev and West German Chancellor Helmut Kohl sign a joint declaration in Bonn which promises respect for human rights and expresses support for disarmament measures. One passage constitutes Gorbachev's renunciation of the Brezhnev Doctrine.
The sixteenth James Bond film, Licence to Kill, premieres at the Odeon Cinema in London, England. The first Bond film not to use or paraphrase the title of an Ian Fleming story, it is also the second and final film to star Timothy Dalton as the fictional spy. Charles, Prince of Wales and Diana, Princess of Wales attend the premiere.
Aboard Air Force One, U.S. President Bush vetoes a bill passed by the U.S. Congress that would have increased the minimum wage to $4.55 an hour over three years.
The Detroit Pistons win the 1989 NBA Finals, defeating the Los Angeles Lakers 4 games to 0.
Born:
Coline Aumard, French professional squash player; in Villeneuve-Saint-Georges, Paris, France
Ben Barba, Australian rugby league footballer; in Darwin, Northern Territory, Australia
James Calado, English racing driver; in Cropthorne, Worcestershire, England
Ryan McDonagh, American National Hockey League defenceman; in Saint Paul, Minnesota
Daniel Mortimer, Australian rugby league footballer; in Sydney, New South Wales, Australia
Andreas Samaris, Greek footballer; in Patras, Greece
Andreas Sander, German Olympic alpine skier; in Schwelm, North Rhine-Westphalia, West Germany
Tommy Searle, English motocross racer; in Pembury, Kent, England
Lisa Tucker, American singer and actress; in Anaheim, California
Hassan Whiteside, National Basketball Association player; in Gastonia, North Carolina
Erica Wiebe, Canadian Olympic champion wrestler; in Stittsville, Ontario, Canada
Dino Wieser, Swiss professional ice hockey forward
Died:
Fran Allison, 81, American actress and television personality, bone marrow failure
Scott Ross, 38, American-born harpsichordist, pneumonia related to AIDS

June 14, 1989 (Wednesday)
During his first visit to London since leaving office in January, former U.S. President Ronald Reagan has lunch at Buckingham Palace with Queen Elizabeth II, who makes him an honorary knight Grand Cross of the Order of the Bath.
The Secretary of State (United Kingdom) announces that, in cases where people incorrectly refused entry into the UK as children because they were "not related as claimed" can now prove their relationship to their relatives in the UK through DNA fingerprinting, in order to immigrate to the UK they will have to prove that they are still dependent on their UK sponsors and, if they are over 18, that there are compassionate circumstances other than the fact of wrongful separation.

The first Titan IV rocket is launched from Cape Canaveral Air Force Station in Florida, carrying a classified military payload.
Born:
Lucy Hale (born Karen Lucille Hale), American actress and singer; in Memphis, Tennessee
Cory Higgins, National Basketball Association player; in Danville, California
Jubin Nautiyal, Indian playback singer; in Dehradun, Uttar Pradesh, India
Mónica Olivia Rodríguez, Mexican Paralympic middle-distance runner; in Ciudad Guzmán, Zapotlán el Grande, Mexico
Brad Takairangi, Australian-New Zealand rugby league footballer; in Sydney, New South Wales, Australia
Died:
Louis-Philippe-Antoine Bélanger, 82, Canadian politician
Pete de Freitas, 27, English musician and producer (Echo & the Bunnymen), motorcycle accident
Joseph Malula, 71, Congolese Catholic archbishop and cardinal

June 15, 1989 (Thursday)
The 1989 European Parliament election begins in the twelve member states of the European Community.
At the 1989 Irish general election, Fianna Fáil, led by Taoiseach Charles Haughey, fails to win a majority.
The Troubles: 21-year-old soldier Adam Gilbert of the Royal Marines is killed by friendly fire when his patrol fires at a stolen car in Belfast.
Sub Pop releases Bleach, the debut studio album by the American rock band Nirvana.
Born:
Bayley (born Pamela Rose Martinez), American professional wrestler; in San Jose, California
Victor Cabedo, Spanish cyclist; in Onda, Castellón, Spain (d. 2012 in training crash)
Bryan Clauson, American auto racing driver; in Carmichael, California (d. 2016 in race crash)
Alex Puccio (born Alexandrea Elizabeth Cocca), American professional climber; in McKinney, Texas
Died:
Maurice Bellemare, 77, Canadian lawyer and politician, diabetes
Victor French, 54, American actor and director, lung cancer
Judy Johnson (born William Julius Johnson), 89, American Negro league baseball third baseman and manager
Ray McAnally, 63, Irish actor, heart attack

June 16, 1989 (Friday)

End of socialism in Hungary: A crowd of at least 100,000 gathers at Heroes Square in Budapest for the reburial of Imre Nagy, the former Hungarian Prime Minister who had been executed in 1958.
At about 7 a.m., three bank robbers, one of them disguised as a security guard, take four employees and police officer Daniel C. O'Connell hostage at the City National Bank of Florida in Hallandale, Florida. Police Lt. David H. Miles arrives on scene and a shootout ensues. Miles is shot in the upper abdomen and neck, but survives due to his bulletproof vest and arrests one robber; O'Connell shoots a second robber to death. The third man escapes but will be arrested on January 23, 1990. Miles and O'Connell will be named Officers of the Year by the Broward 10-13 Club in New York City in January 1991.
Police evacuate about 7,500 people from the east side of Akron, Ohio due to the discovery of cases of unstable dynamite during building demolition. Members of the Summit County, Ohio hazardous materials squad and the sheriff's bomb squad burn the dynamite safely.
Born: Odion Ighalo, Nigerian footballer; in Lagos, Nigeria
Died:
Arthur Häggblad, 80, Swedish Olympic cross-country skier
Jerzy Pniewski, 76, Polish physicist

June 17, 1989 (Saturday)
Interflug Flight 102 crashes on takeoff from Berlin Schönefeld Airport in East Germany, killing 21 of the 113 people on board.
At least six people die in the crash of an Army National Guard helicopter in Yarmouth Port, Yarmouth, Massachusetts.
Born:
Simone Battle, American singer, dancer and actress (G.R.L.); in Los Angeles, California (d. 2014, suicide by hanging)
Georgios Tofas, Cypriot footballer; in Larnaca, Cyprus
Died:
S. David Griggs, 49, American naval aviator and NASA astronaut, in crash of vintage World War II airplane
John Matuszak, 38, American football defensive end and actor, acute propoxyphene intoxication

June 18, 1989 (Sunday)
Second round of the 1989 Polish legislative election.
In the first Greek legislative election of the year, the Panhellenic Socialist Movement, led by Prime Minister of Greece Andreas Papandreou, loses control of the Hellenic Parliament.
Belgian driver Thierry Boutsen of the Williams-Renault team wins the 1989 Canadian Grand Prix at Circuit Gilles Villeneuve in Montreal, Quebec, Canada.
American driver Terry Labonte wins the 1989 Miller High Life 500 stock car race at Pocono International Raceway in Long Pond, Pennsylvania.
Born:
Jonas Acquistapace, German footballer; in North Rhine-Westphalia, West Germany
Pierre-Emerick Aubameyang, French-born Gabonese professional and Olympic footballer; in Laval, Mayenne, France
Chris Harris Jr., National Football League cornerback; in Tulsa, Oklahoma
Anna Veith (born Anna Fenninger), Austrian Olympic champion alpine ski racer; in Hallein, Salzburg, Austria
Renee Olstead (born Rebecca Renee Olstead), American actress and singer; in Houston, Texas
Died:
John Rainey Adkins, 47, American guitarist and songwriter, heart attack
I. F. Stone, 81, American investigative journalist and author

June 19, 1989 (Monday)
Burma officially changes its name in English to the Union of Myanmar, also changing the name of its people's nationality from "Burmese" to "Myanmar". "Rangoon", the name of Myanmar's capital, is to be spelled "Yangon" in English.
No one is injured in the blast. A 62-year-old West German boilerman surprises two suspects before they can set four more bombs to detonate; they flee after hitting the boilerman in the face, leaving him with bruises and scratches. West German authorities believe the Provisional Irish Republican Army is responsible for the bombing.
Spain joins the European Monetary System.
Born: Giacomo Gianniotti, Italian-Canadian actor; in Rome, Italy
Died:
Dieter Aderhold, 49, German political scientist, university teacher and politician
Betti Alver, 82, Estonian poet
Andrey Prokofyev, 30, Soviet Olympic champion track and field athlete, suicide by hanging

June 20, 1989 (Tuesday)
Born:
Christopher Mintz-Plasse, American actor and comedian; in Woodland Hills, California
Javier Pastore, Argentine footballer; in Córdoba, Argentina
Terrelle Pryor, National Football League quarterback and wide receiver; in Jeannette, Pennsylvania
Matthew Raymond-Barker, English singer; in London, England
Died: Otto Kässbohrer, 85, German entrepreneur and design engineer

June 21, 1989 (Wednesday)
The Supreme Court of the United States rules in Texas v. Johnson that American flag-burning is a form of political protest protected by the First Amendment to the United States Constitution.
Born:
Albert Anae, New Zealand rugby union player; in Wellington, New Zealand
Raheleh Asemani, Iranian-born Belgian Olympic taekwondo practitioner; in Karaj, Iran
Jarno Gmelich, Dutch cyclist; in Almere, Netherlands
Abubaker Kaki Khamis, Sudanese Olympic runner; in Muglad, Sudan
Christopher Lamb, American ski jumper
Died:
Lee Calhoun, 56, American Olympic champion track and field athlete
Henri Sauguet, 88, French composer

June 22, 1989 (Thursday)
Angolan Civil War: In Gbadolite, Zaire, 18 African heads of state witness the declaration of Gbadolite, proclaiming a ceasefire in Angola to take effect on June 24.
British police arrest 260 people celebrating the summer solstice at Stonehenge.
The University of Limerick and Dublin City University are raised to the status of universities, the first established in Ireland since independence in 1922.
Born:
Daniel Aase, Norwegian footballer; in Kristiansand, Norway
Jeffrey Earnhardt, American race car driver; in Mooresville, North Carolina
Christian Eyenga (born Christian Eyenga Moenge), Congolese National Basketball Association player; in Kinshasa, Zaire
Jung Yong-hwa, South Korean musician, singer-songwriter, record producer and actor; in Yeoksam-dong, Gangnam District, Seoul, South Korea
Andreas Mikkelsen, Norwegian alpine skier and rally driver; in Oslo, Norway
Cédric Mongongu, Congolese footballer; in Kinshasa, Zaire
Died: Glenn Michael Souther (a.k.a. Mikhail Yevgenyevich Orlov), 32, American-Soviet sailor and defector, suicide by carbon monoxide poisoning

June 23, 1989 (Friday)
The Greek-registered oil tanker World Prodigy strikes a reef at the mouth of Narraganset Bay off Newport, Rhode Island, spilling  of home heating oil into the ocean. Beaches and shellfish beds in Rhode Island are forced to close, but the environmental damage is relatively light.
Born:
Lauren Bennett, English model, dancer and singer (G.R.L.); in Meopham, Kent, England
Lisa Carrington, New Zealand Olympic champion flatwater canoeist; in Tauranga, New Zealand
Marielle Jaffe, American actress, singer and model; in Valencia, Santa Clarita, California
Jordan Nolan, Canadian National Hockey League forward; in Garden River First Nation, Ontario, Canada
Ayana Taketatsu, Japanese voice actress; in Saitama Prefecture, Japan
Died:
Michel Aflaq, 79, Syrian philosopher, sociologist and Arab nationalist
Werner Best, 85, German Nazi official, jurist, police chief and SS-Obergruppenführer leader
Timothy Manning, 79, Irish-American Catholic archbishop and cardinal, cancer

June 24, 1989 (Saturday)
In the aftermath of the Tiananmen Square protests, Jiang Zemin becomes General Secretary of the Chinese Communist Party, succeeding Zhao Ziyang.
The Troubles: 36-year-old Catholic civilian Liam McKee is shot and killed by the Ulster Freedom Fighters at his home in Lisburn, County Antrim.
Born:
Juan José Barros, Peruvian footballer; in Barranquilla, Colombia
Fabian Böhm, German handball player; in Potsdam, East Germany
Ilektra-Elli Efthymiou, Greek Olympic rhythmic gymnast
Teklemariam Medhin, Eritrean Olympic long-distance runner; in Hazega, Ethiopia
Died:
Hibari Misora (born Kazue Katō), 52, Japanese singer, heart failure
Prince Vasili Alexandrovich of Russia, 81

June 25, 1989 (Sunday)
Mexican boxer Humberto González defeats South Korean boxer Lee Yul-woo in a bout in Jeonju, South Korea, to claim the WBC Light Flyweight Championship.
American driver Bill Elliott wins the 1989 Miller High Life 400 (Michigan) stock car race at Michigan International Speedway in Brooklyn, Michigan.
A group of 16- and 17-year-old volunteer firefighters at the District Heights Fire Station in Prince George's County, Maryland, are discussing their frustration with their fire chief's criticisms of their performance when one of them suggests setting a fire to help prove themselves. The conversation leads to some of the first in a series of arsons that will continue until July 1990 and also involve young volunteer firefighters from Boulevard Heights, acting independently of the District Heights group.
Born: Chris Brochu, American actor and singer-songwriter; in Washington, D.C.
Died: Idris Cox, 89, Welsh communist activist and newspaper editor

June 26, 1989 (Monday)
The Supreme Court of the United States rules in Penry v. Lynaugh that the execution of persons with intellectual disabilities does not violate the ban on cruel and unusual punishment in the Eighth Amendment to the United States Constitution.
Born:
Carlos Lopez, American stunt performer; in North Carolina (d. 2014, accidental fall)
Magid Magid, Somali-British activist and politician; in Burao, Somali Democratic Republic
Died:
Howard Charles Green, 93, Canadian politician and parliamentarian
Earle Riddiford, 67, New Zealand mountaineer

June 27, 1989 (Tuesday)
The International Labour Organization adopts the Indigenous and Tribal Peoples Convention, 1989, the major binding international convention concerning indigenous peoples and tribal peoples.
The Troubles: 34-year-old Protestant David Black of the Royal Ulster Constabulary is killed while off-duty by a bomb attached to his car by the Irish Republican Army at his home in Artigarvan, County Tyrone.
Born:
Hana Birnerová, Czech tennis player
Sabino Brunello, Italian chess Grandmaster; in Brescia, Italy
Kimiko Glenn, American actress and singer; in Phoenix, Arizona
Matthew Lewis, British actor; in Leeds, England
Frank Stäbler, German Olympic Greco-Roman wrestler; in Böblingen, Baden-Württemberg, West Germany
Bruna Tenório, Brazilian supermodel; in Maceió, Alagoas, Brazil
Died:
Sir A. J. Ayer , 78, British philosopher
Jack Buetel, 73, American actor
Michele Lupo, 56, Italian film director

June 28, 1989 (Wednesday)
On the 600th anniversary of the Battle of Kosovo, Serbian President Slobodan Milošević delivers the Gazimestan speech at the site of the historic battle.
Born:
Ronny Fredrik Ansnes, Norwegian cross-country skier; in Meldal, Norway (d. 2018, drowned)
Sergio Asenjo, Spanish footballer; in Palencia, Spain
Jason Clark, Australian rugby league footballer; in Sydney, New South Wales, Australia
Andrew Fifita, Tongan rugby league footballer; in Blacktown, New South Wales, Australia
David Fifita, Tongan rugby league footballer; in Blacktown, New South Wales, Australia
Joe Kovacs, American Olympic shot putter; in Bethlehem, Pennsylvania
Markiplier (born Mark Edward Fischbach), American YouTube personality; in Honolulu, Hawaii
Nicole Rottmann, Austrian tennis player; in Wagna, Austria
Julia Zlobina, Azerbaijani Olympic ice dancer; in Kirov, Kirov Oblast, Russian SFSR, Soviet Union
Died:
Joris Ivens, 90, Dutch filmmaker
Alfredo Sadel (born Manuel Alfredo Sánchez Luna), 59, Venezuelan singer and actor, heart attack

June 29, 1989 (Thursday)
Born:
Maciej Szymon Cieśla, Polish graphics designer; in Katowice, Poland (d. 2016, bone cancer)
Isabelle Gulldén, Swedish Olympic and professional handball player; in Sävedalen, Partille Municipality, Sweden
Maciej Sadlok, Polish footballer; in Oświęcim, Poland
Jens Westin, Swedish professional ice hockey defenceman; in Kalix, Sweden

June 30, 1989 (Friday)
1989 Sudanese coup d'état: A military coup led by Omar al-Bashir ousts the civilian government of Prime Minister of Sudan Sadiq al-Mahdi.
Retired United States Navy Admiral James B. Busey IV takes office as the 11th Administrator of the Federal Aviation Administration.
At 10:29 a.m., an electrical fire breaks out on the sixth floor of the South Tower of Peachtree 25th, a 10-story office building in Atlanta, Georgia. The fire kills five people and injures 29.
In Washington, D.C., over 900 artists and supporters of the late Robert Mapplethorpe take part in a protest of the cancellation of his exhibition at the Corcoran Gallery of Art, during which enlargements of Mapplethorpe's photos are projected onto the façade of the gallery.
Born:
Asbel Kiprop, Kenyan Olympic champion middle-distance runner; in Eldoret, Kenya
Ginta Lapiņa, Latvian model; in Riga, Latvian Soviet Socialist Republic, Soviet Union
Steffen Liebig, German rugby union player
Damián Lizio, Argentine-born Bolivian footballer; in Florida, Buenos Aires, Argentina
David Myers, Australian rules footballer
Died: Hilmar Baunsgaard, 69, Danish politician and 34th Prime Minister of Denmark

References

1989
June 1989 events
1989-06
1989-06